Antonios Mangos (1910  December 1940) was a Greek middle-distance runner. He competed in the men's 800 metres at the 1928 Summer Olympics. He died during the Greco-Italian War.

References

1910 births
1940 deaths
Athletes (track and field) at the 1928 Summer Olympics
Greek male middle-distance runners
Olympic athletes of Greece
Place of birth missing
Greek military personnel killed in World War II
20th-century Greek people